Karen Marie Aagaard Ørsted Andersen (born 13 August 1988), known professionally as MØ, is a Danish singer and songwriter. She signed a recording contract with Sony Music Entertainment in 2012, releasing her debut extended play, Bikini Daze (2013), and her debut studio album, No Mythologies to Follow (2014).

MØ collaborated with Australian rapper Iggy Azalea on the 2014 single "Beg for It", which peaked at number 27 on the US Billboard Hot 100, earning MØ her first entry on the chart. The following year, she co-wrote and provided vocals for the Major Lazer and DJ Snake collaboration "Lean On", which became an international success, charting at number one in several countries, number two in the United Kingdom, and number four in the United States. In 2016, MØ was featured on Snakehips's single "Don't Leave", and another Major Lazer single "Cold Water" with Canadian singer Justin Bieber, which debuted at number one on the UK Singles Chart and number two on the US Billboard Hot 100.

MØ earned her first commercially successful solo single with 2016's "Final Song". In 2017, she released her second extended play, When I Was Young, followed by her second studio album, Forever Neverland, in 2018. In 2022, MØ released her third studio album, Motordrome, which was followed by a repackaging titled Dødsdrom.

Life and career

Early life 
Karen Marie Aagaard Ørsted Andersen was born in Ubberud, near Odense, and she grew up in Ejlstrup on the island of Funen, Denmark. Her father, Frans Ørsted, is a psychologist, and her mother, Mette Ørsted, is a teacher. She has an older brother, Kasper, who is a doctor.

MØ was seven when she became interested in music thanks to the Spice Girls. As a teenager, she became interested in punk music and anti-fascist movements, listening to Black Flag, Nirvana, Smashing Pumpkins, Yeah Yeah Yeahs and especially Sonic Youth, saying she looked up to Kim Gordon as a "big hero and role model".

2006–2012: Side projects and MOR

In 2006, MØ released a side project titled The Edmunds, which included tracks such as "Garbage King" and "Polly Get Your Gun". MØ also released several other side projects during 2008–10 including titles such as "A Piece of Music to F*ck to" and "The Rarities". The side-projects included songs that have been previously taken down due to an unknown reason, but has been re-released by a fan on YouTube.

MØ and her friend Josefine Struckmann Pedersen formed duo MOR in 2007, and released two EPs, Fisse I Dit Fjæs("Pussy in Your Face") and Vanvidstimer("Madness Hours"), in 2009 and 2011, respectively. MOR disbanded on 7 September 2012, due to personal reasons.

2012–2015: No Mythologies to Follow and collaborations 

In 2012, MØ began creating a cappella pop songs and began collaborating with producer Ronni Vindahl. On 14 January 2013, MØ released her debut single, "Glass". On 15 March 2013, she released "Pilgrim" with the B-side "Maiden". "Pilgrim" was recognised as P3s Uundgåelige (P3 Unavoidable), a label given to rising artists by Danish radio station DR P3, as it peaked at number eleven on the Danish Singles Chart. On 27 March 2013, she performed live on television at the Danish P3 Guld Awards.

On 7 June 2013, she released the single "Waste of Time". On 18 August 2013, it was confirmed through producer and DJ Avicii's manager Ash Pournouri that MØ had co-written and provided vocals on a track called "Dear Boy" which was later featured on Avicii's debut album, True. On 30 August 2013, she released the single "XXX 88" MØ's first extended play, Bikini Daze, was released on 18 October 2013. In October 2013, she supported AlunaGeorge on UK tour dates. The single "Don't Wanna Dance" debuted on BBC Radio 1 on 16 January 2014 as Zane Lowe's Hottest Record.

MØ's debut studio album, No Mythologies to Follow, was released on 7 March 2014 and her album was inspired by the great Michael Jackson. On the review aggregate site Metacritic, the album has a Metascore of 77 out of 100 indicating "generally favorable" reviews. Music blog Pretty Much Amazing called the album "complex and euphoric", while The Guardian noted that "what MØ lacks in originality, she makes up for with warlike ardour". No Mythologies to Follow debuted at number 58 on the UK Albums Chart, selling 1,438 copies in its first week.

MØ began touring in Europe and the United States in support of the album, ending in June. On 2 June 2014, she made her US television debut on Jimmy Kimmel Live!, where she performed the songs "Don't Wanna Dance" and "Pilgrim". "Walk This Way" was released on 16 June 2014 as a single from No Mythologies to Follow. On 23 June, MØ announced additional United States and Canadian tour dates beginning in September. In November 2014, she won four awards at the Danish Music Awards: Danish Album of the Year, Danish Solo Artist of the Year, Danish Breakthrough Artist of the Year and Danish Music Video of the Year.

In 2014, MØ was featured on Australian rapper Iggy Azalea's song "Beg for It", which was released as the lead single from Azalea's reissue album, Reclassified. Azalea and MØ performed the song for the first time on Saturday Night Live on 25 October. MØ was also featured on Elliphant's "One More", which was officially released as a single on 22 September 2014. The official music video was released a day later, 23 September. MØ also co-wrote the song "All My Love" by Major Lazer, featuring vocals from American singer and songwriter Ariana Grande.

MØ co-wrote and provided vocals for another Major Lazer song, "Lean On" with DJ Snake, which was released in March 2015. The single topped the charts globally in MØ's native Denmark, Australia, Finland, Ireland, the Netherlands and New Zealand, while reaching the top five in several countries, including France, Germany, Sweden, the United Kingdom and the United States. According to the IFPI, "Lean On" was the fifth best-selling song of 2015 worldwide, and one of the best-selling singles of all time, with global sales of 13.1 million. Spotify named it as the most streamed song of all time, and has over one billion streams globally as of June 2017. The music video for “Lean On” premiered on April 30, 2015, and became a viral success with over 2.5 billion views on YouTube, making it the sixteenth most viewed video on the site.

2015–2017: When I Was Young EP, and more collaborations

On 1 October 2015, it was announced that the first single from MØ's upcoming second studio album, "Kamikaze", produced by Diplo, would be released on 15 October 2015. On 14 October, the single made its world premiere on a BBC Radio 1 segment hosted by Annie Mac before the studio version was released the following day. "Kamikaze" charted in Denmark, the United Kingdom, Australia and Belgium. On 13 May 2016, "Final Song", the second single from MØ's second album, was released and also made its world premiere on the same radio segment hosted by Mac. The song was co-written with Swedish singer Noonie Bao and English singer MNEK. It became MØ's first top 40 single as a lead artist in the United Kingdom, with the song reaching number 14 on the UK Singles Chart. Additionally, the song reached the top 40 in more than 10 countries worldwide.

On 22 July 2016, Major Lazer released the single "Cold Water" which features Canadian singer Justin Bieber and MØ, marking the fourth time she has worked with Major Lazer. In the United States, "Cold Water" debuted at number two on the Billboard Hot 100, becoming MØ's second top 10 and her third top 40 single, It is also her highest-charting single in the United States. MØ is the highest-charting Danish act along with Jørgen Ingmann ("Apache") and Lukas Graham ("7 Years"), who all reached number two on the Billboard Hot 100. In the United Kingdom, "Cold Water" debuted at number one on the UK Singles Chart. The song became MØ's first number-one single, and she is only the fourth Danish act to reach number one in the UK. Additionally, it is the first time two Danish acts have reached number one in the same year (with the other being Lukas Graham's "7 Years").

On 17 September 2016, MØ announced the release of her new track titled "Drum" on Twitter. It had made special appearances in previous concerts and shows. The song was produced by American producer Bloodpop also co-written by English singer Charli XCX alongside Noonie Bao. In October 2016, the song's official audio was released.

On 6 January 2017, English electronic duo Snakehips premiered their new track "Don't Leave" which features vocals from MØ. The official lyric video was also released the same day, it has been said that it will be featured in Snakehips upcoming debut album. On 10 March 2017 she was featured on Charli XCX's "3AM (Pull Up)" taken from her mixtape, Number 1 Angel. She was featured alongside Sophie on the song "9 (After Coachella)" by Cashmere Cat, which was the fifth single from his debut album, 9. On 21 April 2017 "Nights with You", the third single from her upcoming second studio album, was officially released worldwide after premiering on MistaJam's BBC Radio 1 show the previous day.

On 26 October 2017, MØ released her second extended play, titled When I Was Young, as a surprise. The EP is composed of songs that MØ wrote over the course of four years since the release of No Mythologies to Follow. On 30 October 2017, MØ announced a co-headlining North American tour with Cashmere Cat titled the "Meøw Tour" in support of the EP. The tour took place from January to April 2018. In 2017, MØ co-wrote and provided vocals on Diplo's song "Get It Right" for the album Major Lazer Presents: Give Me Future. They both also performed the song on The Jimmy Fallon Show with an appearance from GoldLink.

2018–present: Forever Neverland and Motordrome

In 2018, MØ collaborated with producer Jack Antonoff to provide vocals for the Love, Simon soundtrack with the song "Never Fall in Love". She also collaborated with Noah Cyrus on the song “We Are...” and was featured on Alma's Heavy Rules Mixtape with the song "Dance for Me".

On 19 October 2018, MØ released her second studio album, Forever Neverland, by Columbia Records. The album was preceded by five singles: "Nostalgia", "Sun in Our Eyes" featuring Diplo, "Way Down", "Imaginary Friend",and "Blur" featuring Foster the People. The album also features collaborations with Charli XCX, What So Not, Two Feet and Empress Of. She revealed that other singles "Kamikaze", "Final Song" and "Nights with You" will only be available on the Japanese edition of the album.

In 2019, MØ performed her single "Blur" on The Tonight Show Starring Jimmy Fallon,  she co-wrote and provided vocals to the theme song for Moominvalley, and was the support act for Panic! at the Disco's tour across the United Kingdom. MØ performed at 2019's Glastonbury Festival and Roskilde Festival. In October 2019, she released her debut mixtape, MMMMØ - The Mix.

On May 27, 2021, MØ released the song "Live To Survive".

In an interview with DIY in July 2021, MØ confirmed that her third album, Motordrome, would be released in 2022. It was later confirmed for release on 28 January 2022.

Artistry

Stage name 
MØ said in an interview from Wonderland Magazine that her grandfather, Mogens Ørsted, who used to be an artist would sign his initials on his paintings. Therefore, she decided she wanted to do the same with the same initials within her own name. The word mø means "maiden" or "virgin to life" in Danish.

Musical style
MØ's music has been classified as electronic, electropop, synth-pop, and indie pop, and has been described as "electro music with guts". The Guardian described her music stating; “her music, muscular and melodic, is a hybrid of bouncy EDM drops and scandipop on steroids”, and NME called her work a cross between Siouxsie Sioux and Janet Jackson. MØ has described her sound as "an organic yet dynamic mix of electro, indie-pop, soul and street vibes". She showcased different musical styles in her debut album, including indie pop, dream pop, dark pop, electronica and alternative R&B. Her second album, Forever Neverland, was described as electropop and dance-pop, containing elements of tropical house, experimental, trip hop, alternative pop and dancehall. MØ's music has been compared to electropop artists Grimes and Twin Shadow, and her vocals to those of Lana Del Rey.

Influences
MØ's influences include the Spice Girls, Sonic Youth, Kim Gordon, Twin Shadow, Frank Ocean, Patti Smith, Björk, Thurston Moore, J Dilla, Dead Kennedys Yeah Yeah Yeahs, Little Dragon, Santigold, Karen O, Black Flag, Bonobo, Nico, Portishead, The Doors, The Smashing Pumpkins, The Clash, MS MR, Wu-Tang Clan, Grimes, SZA, and Lykke Li.

Discography

 No Mythologies to Follow (2014)
 Forever Neverland (2018)
 Motordrome (2022)

Tours

Headlining 
Fall Tour (2014–2015)
When I Was Young Tour (2018)
Forever Neverland World Tour (2019)
Motordrome World Tour: Chapter 1 (2022)

Co-headlining 
 MØ and Cashmere Cat: The Meøw Tour (2017–2018)

Supporting 
 AlunaGeorge – UK Tour (2013)
Years & Years – Communion Tour (2016)
Sia – Nostalgic for the Present Tour (2017)
Panic! at the Disco – Pray for the Wicked Tour (UK dates) (2019)
Imagine Dragons – Mercury Tour (2022)

Awards and nominations

Årets Steppeulv Awards

Billboard Music Award

Danish Music Awards

European Border Breakers Awards

GAFFA-Prisen Awards

Gay Music Chart Awards 
{| class="wikitable Sortable" 	
|-	
! Year 		
! Category 
! Work	
! Outcome 	
! 
|-
| 2017
| Best Danish Music Video
| "Nights with You"
| 
|

iHeartRadio Music Awards

International Dance Music Awards

MTV Europe Music Awards

MTV Video Music Awards

Nordic Music Prize

Rober Awards Music Poll 
{| class="wikitable Sortable" 	
|-	
! Year 		
! Category 
! Work	
! Outcome 	
! 
|-
| 2013
| Best EP
| Bikini Daze
| 
| 
|-
| 2017
| Floorfiller of the Year 
| "3AM (Pull Up)" (with Charli XCX)
| 
|

Sweden GAFFA Awards 
{| class="wikitable Sortable" 	
|-	
! Year 		
! Category 
! Work	
! Outcome 	
! 
|-
| 2019
| Best Foreign Solo Act
| MØ
| 
|

UK Music Video Awards

WDM Radio Awards

Zulu Awards

References

External links
 
 

 
1988 births
21st-century pianists
21st-century Danish women singers
Danish electronic musicians
Danish women pianists
Danish pop singers
Danish women singer-songwriters
Electropop musicians
English-language singers from Denmark
Indie pop musicians
Living people
People from Odense Municipality
Pop pianists
RCA Victor artists
Synth-pop singers
Women in electronic music
21st-century women pianists